William Edward John Charles Kaine (27 June 1900 – 3 November 1968) was an English professional footballer who played for Sterling Athletic, West Ham United, Tottenham Hotspur, Luton Town, and Bradford City.

Football career 
The goalkeeper joined West Ham United in 1924 and made seven appearances before signing for Tottenham Hotspur. He featured in 12 matches in all competitions for the Lilywhites. After leaving White Hart Lane, Kaine went on to play for Luton Town and Bradford City.

Kaine died in Beckenham in Kent on 3 November 1968.

References

1900 births
1968 deaths
Footballers from East Ham
English footballers
Association football goalkeepers
English Football League players
West Ham United F.C. players
Tottenham Hotspur F.C. players
Luton Town F.C. players
Bradford City A.F.C. players